The following is a list of mayors of the city of Vinnytsia, Ukraine. It includes positions equivalent to mayor, such as chairperson of the city council executive committee.

Mayors 

 , 1899-1917
 Altarzhevsky IS, 1917
 Litvitsky M. O, 1917-1918
 , 1918
 Fanstil A. R, 1918-1920
 , 1923
 , 1925
 , 1926-1927
 , 1927-1928
 Mentsev N. D, 1931
 , 1932-1934
 , 1935-1936
 Fursa Stefan Vasilyevich, 1939-1941
 , 1940s?
 Krutko Pavlo Ivanovych, 1944-1945
 , 1945-1946
 Petrov Petro Vladimirovich, 1946-1949
 Bagriy Hryhorii Oleksiiovych, 1949-1953
 , 1953-1958
 Ogorodnik Stepan Vasilyevich, 1958-1962
 , 1962-1963
 , 1963-1964
 Marchenko Vladimir Viktorovich, 1964-1968
 Holovaty Volodymyr Fedorovych, 1968-1972
 Zhmaka Boris Omelyanovich, 1972-1975
 , 1975-1987
 Ivanov Yuri Ivanovich, 1987-1990
 Yuriev Vladimir Ivanovich, 1990-1991
 Kostin Mykola Fedorovych, 1991-1992
 , 1992-2000
 , 2000-2002
 Oleksandr Dombrovskyi, 2002-2005 
 Volodymyr Groysman, 2006-2014 
 , 2014-

See also
 Vinnytsia history
 History of Vinnytsia (in Russian)

References

This article incorporates information from the Ukrainian Wikipedia.

History of Vinnytsia
Vinnytsia